Kimberly "Kim" Seals (née Turner, formerly McKenzie, born March 21, 1961) is an American former athlete who competed mainly in the 100 meter hurdles. She won the 1984 US Olympic trials and went on to win a bronze medal at the 1984 Los Angeles Olympics. She  also won the 1988 US national title.

Career
Turner was born in Birmingham, Alabama. While at Mumford High School in Detroit, Michigan she set the still standing NFHS national high school record in the 110 yard hurdles at 13.6.  The federation converted record-keeping to metric distances shortly afterward.

As Kim Turner, she won the 100m hurdles at the 1984 US Olympic trials, running 13.12 seconds to win one of the closest races in history, as Benita Fitzgerald-Brown (2nd), Pam Page (3rd) and Stephanie Hightower (4th) all ran 13.13 secs. Two months later at the Los Angeles Olympics, she was again involved in a photo-finish, this time tying for the bronze medal with Michèle Chardonnet of France in 13.06, in a race won by Fitzgerald-Brown with Great Britain's Shirley Strong second.

Competing as Kim McKenzie, she won the 100m hurdles at the US Championships in June 1988, edging Benita Fitzgerald-Brown 12.84 to 12.85. A month later, she finished fifth in the 100m hurdles final at the US Olympic trials in 13.01 seconds. She finished fourth in the 60m hurdles final at the 1989 IAAF World Indoor Championships in 7.92 secs, and seventh in the final at the 1991 IAAF World Indoor Championships in 8.05 secs.

At the 1992 US Olympic trials, she failed to make the 100m hurdles final, finishing sixth in her semifinal in 13.28 secs. Three months later, she finished fifth at the 1992 IAAF World Cup, running 13.36. After her track career, she was the track and cross country coach at the Alabama A&M University for almost 20 years (1996–2015).

Competition record
Note: In 1984 and 1988 the US Olympic Trials were a separate event from the National Championships.

References

1961 births
Living people
Track and field athletes from Birmingham, Alabama
American female hurdlers
Olympic bronze medalists for the United States in track and field
Athletes (track and field) at the 1983 Pan American Games
Athletes (track and field) at the 1984 Summer Olympics
UTEP Miners women's track and field athletes
Medalists at the 1984 Summer Olympics
Pan American Games medalists in athletics (track and field)
Pan American Games silver medalists for the United States
Medalists at the 1983 Pan American Games
20th-century American women
21st-century American women